This is a list of famous Balearic people (people from the Balearic Islands, one of the Autonomous Communities of Spain). 

 Álex Abrines (born 1993), basketball player 
 Antoni Maria Alcover i Sureda (1862–1932), linguist and folk tale writer
 Simón Andreu (born 1941), actor
 Miquel Barceló (born 1957), painter 
 Fortunio Bonanova (1895–1969), actor, opera singer
 Maria del Mar Bonet (born 1947), singer
 Nicolas Cotoner (1608–1680), Grand Master of the Knights of St. John
 Raphael Cotoner (1601–1663), Grand Master of the Knights of St. John
 Abraham Cresques (14th century), cartographer 
 Jehuda Cresques (14th–15th centuries), cartographer 
 DJ Sammy (born 1969), disc-jockey
 Simeon ben Zemah Duran, Rashbatz (1361–1444), rabbinical authority
 Rudy Fernández (basketball) (born 1985), basketball player
 Elena Gómez (born 1985), artistic gymnast 
 Joan Horrach (born 1974), cyclist
 Maria de la Pau Janer (born 1966), novelist
 Isabel of Majorca (1337–1403), queen
 James II of Majorca (1243–1311), king
 James III of Majorca (1315–1349), king
 James IV of Majorca (c. 1336–1375), king
 Ramon Llull (1232–1315), writer and philosopher 
 Jorge Lorenzo (born 1987), motorcycle racer, 2006 and 2007 250 cc World Champion, 2010 and 2012 MotoGP Champion 
 Juan March Ordinas (1880–1962), financier
 Juan Mascaró (1897–1987), Sanskrit translator 
 Antonio Maura (1853–1925), prime minister of Spain 
 Carlos Moyá (born 1976), tennis player
 Francisco Javier Muñoz (born 1980), Xisco, football player
 Miguel Ángel Nadal (born 1966), football player
 Rafael Nadal (born 1986), tennis player
 Mathieu Orfila (1787–1853), chemist
 Juan José Pérez Hernández (1725–1775), explorer
 Albert Riera (born 1982), footballer
 Carme Riera (born 1948), novelist
 Guillem Sagrera (14th century–1456), architect and sculptor
 Sancho I of Majorca (1276–1324), king
 Junípero Serra (1713–1784), friar, California's colonizer
 Llorenç Serra Ferrer (born 1953), football manager
 Anselm Turmeda (1355–1423), writer
 Llorenç Villalonga i Pons (1897–1980), writer
 Agustí Villaronga (born 1953), filmmaker

See also 
 List of Spaniards

List
Balearic
Balearics
Balearics